James Blake and Mardy Fish were the defending champions, but lost in the quarterfinals this year.

Wayne Arthurs and Paul Hanley won the title, defeating Yves Allegro and Michael Kohlmann 7–6(7–4), 6–4 in the final.

Seeds

Draw

Draw

External links
Draw

SAP Open
2005 ATP Tour